Kakabakaba Ka Ba? (English: Does Your Heart Beat Faster?) is a 1980 Filipino musical comedy film directed by Mike de Leon, with a screenplay Clodualdo del Mundo Jr., and Raquel Villavicencio. It stars Christopher de Leon, Charo Santos, Jay Ilagan, and Sandy Andolong as two pairs of lovers who accidentally find themselves in the middle of a conflict between the agents of rivaling Japanese and Chinese drug syndicates. The film features cameos made by APO Hiking Society members Boboy Garovillo, Danny Javier, and Jim Paredes.

In 2015, the film was digitally restored by the ABS-CBN Film Restoration Project.

Plot

Cold open
In 1964, Onota (Boboy Garovillo), a member of the Japanese yakuza, arrives at Manila International Airport but is denied entry into the Philippines after customs discovers that he is smuggling diamonds hidden in a Japanese doll. Five years later, Onota attempts to enter the country again, this time disguised as a hippie, but is once more caught by customs smuggling money hidden in his guitar. In 1976, Onota disguises himself as a Japanese woman wearing a kimono but is caught smuggling opium inside his kimono sash.

Main plot
In the present, Onota is given one more chance by his boss, the Japanese Master (George Javier). In order to complete his mission this time around, on the flight to Manila, Onota places a cassette tape, which holds some contraband, into the pocket of Johnny (Christopher de Leon), an unassuming Filipino returning home. The contraband, now on Johnny, is finally able to go through Philippine customs. Soon, Johnny, along with his love interest Melanie (Charo Santos), and their friends Nonong (Jay Ilagan) and Nancy (Sandy Andolong), find themselves harassed by various groups who are interested in getting the cassette tape. Aside from Onota, there is Madame Lily (Armida Siguion-Reyna), who heads a Chinese crime syndicate, as well as the mysterious Fr. Blanco (Leo Martinez). A series of hijinks ensue. Johnny and his friends meet with Santacruzan (Danny Javier) and discover that the cassette tape holds opium, which Nonong, Nancy, and Santacruzan take.

The foursome travel to Bagiuo in disguise as priests and nuns. They uncover a plot by the Japanese syndicate, locally led by Pinoy Master (Johnny Delgado), for the large-scale distribution of opium through communion wafers so as to control the Filipino population. The Filipinos are able to foil the scheme in a musical extravaganza. The film ends with the two couples marrying in a joint ceremony.

Cast

Release
Kakabakaba Ka Ba? was released in the Philippines on August 8, 1980, by LVN Pictures. The film made its international release, starting in Japan on January 31, 1993. Aside from Japan, the film was also released in France on July 4, 2008, and Italy on May 6, 2011, as part of the Udine Far East Film Festival.

Restoration
In 2015, the film was digitally restored and remastered by the ABS-CBN Film Restoration Project in cooperation with L'Immagine Ritrovata in Bologna, Italy. The restored version premiered on December 9, 2015, at Trinoma mall as part of the Cinema One Originals festival.

In 2017, the digitally restored version of the film screened at the 30th Tokyo International Film Festival as part of the Cross Cut Asia program. Kenji Ishizaka, the program director, explained his decision in choosing to include the film in the line-up, saying:

Television release
The restored version of the film made its television premiere on ABS-CBN's Sunday late-night special presentation program, Sunday's Best, on July 2, 2017, at 11:15 PM. It was the first restored film to be broadcast under the Restored Classics banner of the said special program. According to the Kantar Media-TNS statistics, the showing attained a 2.9% nationwide audience share while for the AGB Nielsen statistics, it attained a 1.1% nationwide audience share.

Reception

Critical reception
Kenji Ishizaka, the program director of the Cross Cut Asia section, loved watching the film when it first premiered in the Japanese mainland in 1991. The program director was then part of the Japan Foundation at the time of the release. He described the film as "a high-quality musical" and he felt that most of the classic films, including Kakabakaba Ka Ba?, should be watched by the younger generations.

Accolades

See also
Mike De Leon
Christopher De Leon
Charo Santos
Jay Ilagan
Sandy Andolong
Johnny Delgado
APO Hiking Society

References

External links

1980s musical comedy films
Philippine musical comedy films
Star Cinema films
1980 films
Films directed by Mike De Leon